The term Aeronáutica Militar may refer to:

 The original name of the air arm of the Spanish Army (1913-1931) and the Spanish Republican Army (1931-1936); merged with the Naval Aviation (Aeronáutica Naval) in 1936 to form the Spanish Republican Air Force, today's Spanish Air Force
 The name of the air arm of the Portuguese Army from 1924 to 1952, today's Portuguese Air Force
 The name of the military aeronautics division of the Uruguayan Army from 1935 to 1952, today's Uruguayan Air Force

See also
Military aviation